Félix Alexander Borja Valencia (born April 2, 1983) is an Ecuadorian footballer, who last played for El Nacional in the Ecuadorian Serie A. He is nicknamed the "kangaroo", or "the cobra of Ecuador", for the spring in his jump. His height makes it easy to score goals for his club and country.

Club career

El Nacional
Felix Borja previously played for El Nacional of Ecuador.

Olympiacos
His transfer to Greek league champions Olympiacos made him the first Ecuadorian player to play for a Greek team. Borja was declared Copa Libertadores de América's joint top goalscorer two months after his transfer to Olympiacos.

Mainz 05
Due to his sub-standard performances for Olympiacos in his first season, as well as the fact that he occupies a non-EU player spot at his current team's roster, Olympiacos had the desire at the end of the 2006–07 season to sell him or loan him for the upcoming season. Due to that decision by the club, Borja was loaned out to German club Mainz 05 for the 2007–08 season. At the end of the season, Mainz signed him permanently. During the winter transfer window of the 2010-11 season, Borja was allowed to leave on a free transfer ahead of an expected move to Mexican club Puebla F.C.

Puebla
Having limited success, especially after Mainz earned promotion to the Bundesliga, he transferred to the Mexican club Puebla.

Pachuca
In the 2011–12 Apertaura season, he was transferred to Pachuca F.C.

Loan to Chivas USA
On 14 August 2014, Borja joined Major League Soccer team Chivas USA on loan from LDU Quito.

South China
On 28 December 2015, Hong Kong giants South China announced the capture of the player via Facebook.

Return to El Nacional
On 24 January 2017, Felix Borja signed a contract with El Nacional. Previously he was a free agent.

International career

He was included in the Ecuador for the 2006 FIFA World Cup. He played in several of the 2006 FIFA World Cup qualifying matches for the Ecuador national team, including the game against Uruguay which confirmed their passage to Germany 06. He made one appearance at the tournament against Germany, where they were defeated 0–3.

He featured in friendlies after the FIFA World Cup, even scoring against Brazil in an October 2006 friendly in Sweden. He was called up to Ecuador for the 2007 Copa América, and started in the final group game against Brazil.

International goals
Scores and results list Ecuador's goal tally first.

Career statistics

Honours
Serie A de Ecuador:
2005 C, 2006
Super League Greece:
2006–07

References

External links
 

1983 births
Living people
People from San Lorenzo, Ecuador
Ecuadorian footballers
C.D. El Nacional footballers
Olympiacos F.C. players
1. FSV Mainz 05 players
Club Puebla players
C.F. Pachuca players
L.D.U. Quito footballers
Chivas USA players
Mushuc Runa S.C. footballers
Real Garcilaso footballers
South China AA players
Super League Greece players
Bundesliga players
2. Bundesliga players
Liga MX players
Major League Soccer players
Peruvian Primera División players
2006 FIFA World Cup players
2001 Copa América players
2007 Copa América players
Association football forwards
Ecuador international footballers
Ecuadorian expatriate footballers
Ecuadorian expatriate sportspeople in the United States
Expatriate footballers in Greece
Expatriate footballers in Germany
Expatriate footballers in Mexico
Expatriate soccer players in the United States
Expatriate footballers in Peru
Expatriate footballers in Hong Kong